Saung Taw Shin is a 1940 Burmese black-and-white drama film, directed by Loon Pe starring Pyi Hla Pe and May Shin. The film is about the origin of U Shin Gyi nat.

Cast
Pyi Hla Pe as Maung Shin, U Shin Gyi
May Shin as Mal Saw Nhyar
Shwe Nyar Maung as Maung Htal
Thar Gaung as Thar Gaung
Gyan Sein as mother of Maung Shin

References

1940 films
Burmese-language films
Films shot in Myanmar
Burmese black-and-white films